is a dōjin song and Internet meme from Japan. The song itself describes a player trying to defeat the boss character Air Man (and later in the song Wood Man) in Mega Man 2.

History
The song was first posted on Nico Nico Douga on May 26, 2007. A vocal version performed by dōjin music group  was later posted to their website and YouTube on June 1, 2007, and later to Nico Nico Douga on July 1. This version was a collaboration with fellow dōjin musicians SoundCYCLONE and Scinicade. An English version titled "Can't Beat Air Man" was originally posted to both Nico Nico Douga and YouTube on December 24, 2007, but are no longer available. "Air Man ga Taosenai" was incorporated into the second of the Kumikyoku Nico Nico Douga videos and has been included in all but one of the subsequent mashups.

Translations
The song has had a number of English translations and covers made since its release. Some of the most popular translations include one by Kiwi Kenobi released on YouTube in July 2008 and one by YouTuber jan Misali released on October 25, 2022, which also incorporates Toki Pona into its translation.

Commercial release
Team.Nekokan's version of "Air Man ga Taosenai" was distributed at Comiket on a CD along with an acoustic version of this song. Team. Nekokan's original version and its instrumental are available through the iTunes Store. It is also included on the Nico Nico Douga album  released July 9, 2008. A cover version arranged by Ryu☆ and sung by zaki was released on the CD  on April 1, 2009.

References

Internet memes introduced in 2007
Japanese songs
Mega Man
2007 YouTube videos
Video game memes
Doujin music